Fabian Gustavo Lagman is an Argentine former professional association football player who was part of the 1988–89 championship squad at Maccabi Haifa. His son, Gaston, is now a professional footballer in Argentina.

Biography

Playing career 
In 1988, Maccabi Haifa decided to bring in Jewish players from Argentina since they would qualify as immigrants and not as transfers. The Jewish Agency paid for all travel and even some living expenses for new immigrants, saving the club money. Lagman was brought in under these circumstances, along with Fabian Grimberg and Patricio Sayegh.

References

External links
 Profile and short biography of Fabian Lagman on Maccabi Haifa's official website 
 Fabian Lagman at BDFA.com.ar 

1962 births
Living people
Argentine Jews
Jewish Argentine sportspeople
Argentine footballers
Club Atlético Atlanta footballers
Club Almagro players
Argentine emigrants to Israel
Israeli footballers
Maccabi Haifa F.C. players
Hapoel Tirat HaCarmel F.C. players
Israeli people of Argentine-Jewish descent
Sportspeople of Argentine descent
Association football midfielders